European route E 80, also known as Trans-European Motorway or TEM, is an A-Class West-East European route, extending from Lisbon, Portugal to Gürbulak, Turkey, on the border with Iran. At its eastern end it joins end-on with Asian Highway AH1 which continues all the way to Japan.

Route 

: Lisbon (start of concurrency with ) - Torres Novas - Coimbra - Aveiro (end of concurrency with )
: Aveiro - Viseu - Guarda - Vilar Formoso

: Fuentes de Oñoro - Salamanca - Tordesillas - Burgos
: Burgos
: Burgos (start of concurrency with )
: Burgos - Miranda de Ebro - Vitoria-Gasteiz
: Vitoria-Gasteiz
: Vitoria-Gasteiz - Eibar
: Eibar (start of concurrency with ) - Donostia/S. Sebastian - Irún

: Hendaye - Bayonne (end of concurrency with  )
: Bayonne - Pau - Toulouse
: Toulouse
: Toulouse - Villefranche-de-Lauragais - Carcassonne - Narbonne
: Narbonne (start of concurrency with ) - Béziers - Montpellier - Nîmes (end of concurrency with )
: Nîmes - Salon-de-Provence 
: Salon-de-Provence - Aix-en-Provence
: Aix-en-Provence - Nice

: Ventimiglia - Savona - Genoa
: Genoa - La Spezia - Lucca - Rosignano Solvay
: Rosignano Solvay - Grosseto - Tarquinia
: Tarquinia - Civitavecchia
: Civitavecchia - Rome
: Rome
: Rome - Tivoli - Borgorose
: Borgorose - Pescara
: Pescara
: Pescara - Porto di Pescara

Gap - Adriatic Sea
:  Porto di Pescara -  Dubrovnik

: Dubrovnik (start of concurrency with ) - Karasovići

 
: Debeli Brijeg - Petrovac na Moru (start of concurrency with ) - Sutomore (end of concurrency with )
: Sutomore - Virpazar
: Virpazar - Podgorica - Ribarevina
: Ribarevina - Berane - Dračenovac

: Mehov Krš - Ribariće
: Ribariće - Vitkoviće

: Mitrovica - Pristina (end of concurrency with )
: Prishtina - Trudë
: Trudë - Merdar

: Merdare - Prokuplje - Merošina (start of concurrency with )
: Merošina - Trupale (end of concurrency with )
: Niš - Pirot - Gradinje

: Kalotina - Dragoman
: Dragoman - Sofia
: Sofia
: Sofia - Plovdiv - Chirpan
: Chirpan - Dimitrovgrad - Svilengrad - Kapitan Andreevo

: Kapıkule - Edirne
: Edirne - Babaeski - Silivri - Istanbul
: Istanbul
: Istanbul - Gebze - Izmit - Düzce - Bolu - Gerede
: Gerede - Ilgaz - Merzifon - Refahiye - Erzincan - Aşkale - Erzurum - Horasan - Ağrı - Doğubeyazıt - Gürbulak

: Bazargan

Coordinates 
Western Terminus - Lisbon   
Eastern Terminus - Gürbulak

Notes

External links 
 UN Economic Commission for Europe: Overall Map of E-road Network (2007)

80
E080
E080
E080
E080
E080
E080
E080
E080
E080
E080